Virbia strigata is a moth in the family Erebidae first described by Walter Rothschild in 1910. It is found in Suriname and Brazil.

References

strigata
Moths described in 1910